Mir Sarfraz Bugti (Urdu) (born June 1, 1981) is a Pakistani politician. He is the son of Mir Ghulam Qadir Masori Bugti. The latter is the pioneer of the middle-class movement against the tribal Sardars of Dera Bugti. Sarfraz Bugti is a prominent politician from Bugti tribe of Balochistan, serving as Minister of Balochistan for Home and Tribal Affairs. Currently, he is serving as a senator of Pakistan.

Politics 
He won the Provincial Assembly elections from Constituency PB-24 as a representative of the Baloch community from Dera Bugti with a clear majority as an independent candidate by securing 10013 votes, and after elections joined PML (N). Sarfraz became Minister of Interior of Balochistan on 14 October 2013. Formerly he spoke against the separatist organization Baluchistan Republic Army headed by Brahamdagh Khan Bugti, grandson of Akbar Bugti. Baluchistan Republic Army is declared as a terrorist organization by the Government of Pakistan. In a BBC interview, Bugti claimed that the Indian agency Research and Analysis Wing (RAW) was involved in funding and arming militants in Balochistan, but that it stopped doing so after its agent was arrested in Balochistan. Bugti attended the famous Lawrence College, Murree , during his stay at the boarding school he participated in debates and was a keen sportsman.

References 

1980 births
Living people
Baloch people
Pakistani nationalists
Pakistan Muslim League (N) politicians
People from Dera Bugti District
Balochistan MPAs 2013–2018
Lawrence College Ghora Gali alumni